The Condor Group is a fleet of helicopters operated by the Mexico City's Federal District Secretariat of Public Security, in command of the Secretary of Homeland Security and the local head of government, Claudia Sheinbaum.

History

The organization founded in 1971 with two helicopters from the Ministry of Security. In 1983, then president, Miguel de la Madrid Hurtado opened a new heliport  for the Ministry of Public Security in Mexico City, now the headquarters for the helicopter operations.

During 1970 and 1980, three helicopters were donated to this organization and in 1980 it acquired four Eurocopter AS350 Écureuil helicopters.

Statistics
Although the unit serves 23,564 missions a year, statistics from the organization show that only 42.63% are security work, support for 1.58% of units, aerial medical evacuations 4.15% and 51.61% road patrols

Personnel
Condor Group consists of 38 mechanics, four doctors (3 general practitioners [Dr. Miguel Angel Colin, Dr. Arcadio Ramirez, Dr. Emmanuel Urquieta] and a doctor specializing in trauma and orthopedics, Dr Juan Carlos Lara. 13 operators aeromedical technicians, 17 pilots and 6 students in training as TUM ITFP.

Fleet

 7 Eurocopter AS 355 Ecureuil 2 - 4 active and three permanently out of service, one of which was donated to the units ESIME Ticoman IPN institution with which the group has an agreement to provide its mechanics minor maintenance tasks. The other two aircraft are on the Technical Police Training Institute and at the base of Task Force for display purposes.
 1 Bell 412 (XC-SPV)
 2 Bell 206 (MDF XC, XC-PGJ)

In January 2015, the fleet has been renewed with five helicopters Bell:

 4 Bell 407GX (DSA-XC, XC-DMA-DMX XC, XC-HDF,)
 1 Bell 429 GlobalRanger (XC-DMM)

References

Law enforcement in Mexico
Mexico City International Airport
Police aviation
Helicopters